Mill Creek is a  long 1st order tributary to Blackbird Creek in New Castle County, Delaware.

Course
Mill Creek rises on the Cedar Swamp divide about 0.5 miles northeast of Taylors Bridge in New Castle County, Delaware.  Mill Creek then flows north to meet Blackbird Creek about 2 miles north-northeast of Taylors Bridge, Delaware.

Watershed
Mill Creek drains  of area, receives about 43.4 in/year of precipitation, has a topographic wetness index of 946.15 and is about 2.1% forested.

See also
List of rivers of Delaware

References 

Rivers of Delaware
Rivers of New Castle County, Delaware